Mohamed Sedik (born November 25, 1978) is an Egyptian footballer. He now plays in the defender position for Itesalat.

Titles as a player 

5 For Ahly
1 Egyptian League (2006/2007)
1 Egyptian Cup (2006/2007) 
1 Egyptian Super Cup (2006/2007)
1 African Champions League 2006
1 African Super Cup 2006

7 For Zamalek
2 Egyptian League title (2002/2003 & 2003/2004)
1 African Champions League title (2002)
1 African Super Cup title (2002)
1 Arab Club Championship Title (2003)
1 Egyptian Saudi Super Cup (2003)

1 For Kocaelispor
1 Turkish Cup Title 2002

External links
 TTF statistics

1978 births
Living people
Al Mokawloon Al Arab SC players
Kocaelispor footballers
Zamalek SC players
Al Ahly SC players
Al Masry SC players
Egypt international footballers
Expatriate footballers in Turkey
Egyptian footballers
Egyptian expatriate sportspeople in Turkey
Association football defenders
Egyptian Premier League players